The 1919 Württemberg state election was held on 12 January 1919 to elect the 150 members of the Württemberg state constituent assembly.

Results

References 

Wurttemburg
1919
January 1919 events